John Charles Beckwith (1788 – 11 October 1819) was an English Organist, born in Norwich.

Family

He was the son of the organist John Christmas Beckwith.

He is buried in St Peter Mancroft.

Career

He was jointly 
Organist of St Peter Mancroft 1809 - 1819
Organist of Norwich Cathedral 1809 - 1819

References

Cathedral organists
1788 births
1819 deaths
19th-century classical musicians
19th-century organists